Trastsianets refers to the following places in Belarus.

Maly Trostenets, a village ("Small Trastsianets")
Maly Trostenets extermination camp
Vialiki Trastsianets, a village ("Big Trastsianets")

See also
 Trostenets (disambiguation)